Nido Pavitra is a Congress Party MLA and Parliamentary Secretary in the Health and Family Welfare Department of Arunachal Pradesh, India. His son, Nido Taniam was the victim of murder.

References 

Living people
Indian National Congress politicians
Arunachal Pradesh MLAs 2009–2014
Year of birth missing (living people)
People's Party of Arunachal politicians